Calamophylliopsis elegans is an extinct species of hexacorals. It is found only at Sainpug, Gegyai, Tibet Autonomous Region (Cretaceous of China).

References 

 H. Löser and W. Liao. 2001. Cretaceous corals from Tibet (China) - stratigraphic and palaeobiogeographic aspects. Journal of Asian Earth Sciences 19:661-667

Dermosmiliidae
Animals described in 1990
Late Cretaceous animals of Asia
Early Cretaceous invertebrates
Prehistoric animals of China
Cretaceous China
Early Cretaceous animals of Asia
Late Cretaceous invertebrates